Yuriy Hryhorovych Sevastyanenko (born 2 January 1942) is a Ukrainian retired football manager.

During his tenure with Wydad AC in 1989–1994, he won three Botola titles, in addition to the Moroccan Throne Cup, CAF Champions League, Arab Club Champions Cup, and Afro-Asian Club Championship.

Notes

References

Living people
1942 births
Association football forwards
Ukrainian footballers
People from Berdiansk
Olympique Club de Khouribga managers
Wydad AC managers
Expatriate football managers in Morocco
Expatriate football managers in Oman
Al Shabab FC (Riyadh) managers
CS Sfaxien managers
Expatriate football managers in Saudi Arabia
Raja CA managers
Expatriate football managers in Libya
Expatriate football managers in Algeria
Ukrainian football managers
Ukrainian expatriate football managers
Soviet football managers
Soviet expatriate football managers
Soviet expatriate sportspeople in Morocco
Ukrainian expatriate sportspeople in Algeria
Ukrainian expatriate sportspeople in Morocco
Ukrainian expatriate sportspeople in Saudi Arabia
Ukrainian expatriate sportspeople in Oman
Sportspeople from Zaporizhzhia Oblast
Botola managers